Max T. Hyde Jr. (born October 29, 1973) is an American politician. He is a member of the South Carolina House of Representatives from the 32nd District, serving since 2018. He is a member of the Republican party.

References

Living people
1973 births
Republican Party members of the South Carolina House of Representatives
21st-century American politicians